The Lopper Road Tunnel is a tunnel in central Switzerland. The tunnel connects Hergiswil in the canton of Nidwalden with Alpnach in the canton of Obwalden, and forms part of the A8 motorway. The tunnel has two lanes (one in each direction), and there is no central reservation. The tunnel runs under the Lopper, a shoulder of Mount Pilatus which extends into Lake Lucerne.

The northern portal of the Lopper Tunnel is near to that of the Kirchenwald Tunnel on the A2 motorway, and most of the junction between the two motorways lies to the north of their respective portals.

The Lopper I railway tunnel, on the Zentralbahn Brünig line, parallels the Lopper road tunnel. The Lopper II railway tunnel, on the Zentralbahn Luzern–Stans–Engelberg line, parallels the Kirchenwald road tunnel.

References 

Buildings and structures in Nidwalden
Buildings and structures in Obwalden
Transport in Nidwalden
Transport in Obwalden
Road tunnels in Switzerland